Sergei Vitalievich Glushko (born 8 March 1970) is a Russian actor, singer and fitness model, known in the countries of the former USSR as a striptease dancer under the pseudonym of Tarzan and as the husband of Natasha Korolyova. Founder and creator of the first-ever male revue “Tarzan Dance Show” in Russia, who performs in Moscow, and tours all around the world. The show is 60 minutes, interactive performance with choreographed dances, amazing music, and costumes and lights. Their main competitor is Chippendales.

Biography
Sergei Glushko was born and raised in Mirny, Arkhangelsk Oblast,  Russian SFSR, Soviet Union into a mixed Ukrainian-Belarusian family. After completing the A.F. Mozhaysky's Military-Space Academy, Sergei worked as an engineer at the Plesetsk Cosmodrome for a year. Between 1992 and 1995 he was married to servicewoman Elena Perevedentseva.

In the mid-1990s, he moved to Moscow and began his modeling career and appeared in several music videos, including Because one can not be so beautiful by the band Bely Oryol. Sergei acted in the Presnyakov brothers play "Flooring" and later got an offer to become a stripper. After five years of work, famous artists began to invite him to perform with them. His first appearance in film was an uncredited role in 8 ½ $. Afterwards, he studied theater at the Russian Academy of Theatre Arts.

Sergei Glushko became romantically involved with the well-known Russian singer Natasha Korolyova in 2001. Their relationship received widespread coverage in Russian media. He married Natasha in 2003 and their son Arkhip was born in 2002.

In 2009, Sergei released the book Cult of Body in which he shares his advice on fitness and nutrition.

Glushko was listed on Myrotvorets in 2017 for "deliberate violation of the state border of Ukraine" – he was a member of the jury of the beauty contest "Pearl of the Black Sea-2017", which was held in Sevastopol in July.

Selected filmography
8 ½ $ (uncredited)
My Fair Nanny (cameo)
Happy Together as Ruslan
Kingdom of Crooked Mirrors (cameo)
Univer (cameo)
Night Shift as Zhenya "King Kong"
Moscow Gigolo as Sergey Vitalievich

References

External links

 Official website

1970 births
Living people
People from Arkhangelsk Oblast
20th-century Russian male singers
20th-century Russian singers
Russian bodybuilders
Male erotic dancers
Russian male film actors
Russian male models
Russian people of Belarusian descent